Al Ma'abiyat is a large archeological site in Wadi al-'Ula, Saudi Arabia.

The name المعبيات means the Maple and it has been tentatively identified as the ruins of Qurh, a wealthy city of late antiquity.

The ruins field covers 64 hectares in area and there is evidence at the site of irrigation, mining and ceramic production.

References

History of Saudi Arabia
Geography of Saudi Arabia